X610Z: existenz is an out-of-print Trading Card Board Game (TCBG), best described as a trading card game with a game board. X610Z is a game in the fantasy and science fiction genres, based on a story about a fictive happening in the near future. Every 4–5 months a new set will be introduced. The release of the second set(ACT II: Spoils of War) is planned for the end of May 2010.

The game play involves the use of playing cards and movement of fantasy creatures across the game board. All creatures (in the game referred to as "summons") are represented by pawns.

X610Z is a competitive strategy game with tournaments and championships that can be played by 2 to 6 players: Single Play (1 player versus 1 player), Multi Play (2-6 individual players) and Team Play (2 players versus 2 players, 3 players versus 3 players).

X610Z is designed and published in 2009 by the Dutch company Quantuum Magic BV. The basic set is called ACT I: The New Era. Advized minimum age: 12.

See also
 List of collectible card games |  
 List of board games

External links
 Official website
 Boardgamegeek

Card games introduced in 2009
Collectible card games
Collectible-based games
Dedicated deck card games
Trading cards